The Taiwanese Hakka Romanization System is a romanization system for Taiwanese Hakka. It was published by the Ministry of Education, Taiwan, in 2012.

See also
 Languages of Taiwan
 Taiwanese Hakka

References

2012 establishments in Taiwan
Hakka Chinese
Languages of Taiwan
Romanization of Chinese